Samuel Barclay Beckett (13 April 1906 – 22 December 1989) was an Irish novelist, dramatist, short story writer, theatre director, poet, and literary translator. His literary and theatrical work features bleak, impersonal and tragicomic experiences of life, often coupled with black comedy and nonsense. His work became increasingly minimalist as his career progressed, involving more aesthetic and linguistic experimentation, with techniques of repetition and self-reference. He is considered one of the last modernist writers, and one of the key figures in what Martin Esslin called the Theatre of the Absurd.

A resident of Paris for most of his adult life, Beckett wrote in both French and English. During the Second World War, Beckett was a member of the French Resistance group Gloria SMH (Réseau Gloria) and was awarded the Croix de Guerre in 1949.  He was awarded the 1969 Nobel Prize in Literature "for his writing, which—in new forms for the novel and drama—in the destitution of modern man acquires its elevation". In 1961 he shared the inaugural Prix International with Jorge Luis Borges. He was the first person to be elected Saoi of Aosdána in 1984.

Early life
Samuel Barclay Beckett was born in the Dublin suburb of Foxrock on 13 April 1906, the son of William Frank Beckett (18711933), a quantity surveyor of Huguenot descent, and Maria Jones Roe, a nurse. His parents were both 35 when he was born, and had married in 1901. Beckett had one older brother named Frank Edward (1902–1954). At the age of five, he attended a local playschool in Dublin, where he started to learn music, and then moved to Earlsfort House School near Harcourt Street in Dublin. The Becketts were members of the Church of Ireland; raised as an Anglican, Beckett later became agnostic, a perspective which informed his writing.

Beckett's family home, Cooldrinagh, was a large house and garden complete with tennis court built in 1903 by Beckett's father. The house and garden, its surrounding countryside where he often went walking with his father, the nearby Leopardstown Racecourse, the Foxrock railway station, and Harcourt Street station would all feature in his prose and plays. 

Around 1919 or 1920, he went to Portora Royal School in Enniskillen, which Oscar Wilde had also attended. He left in 1923 and entered Trinity College Dublin, where he studied modern literature and Romance languages, and received his bachelor's degree in 1927. A natural athlete, he excelled at cricket as a left-handed batsman and a left-arm medium-pace bowler. Later, he played for Dublin University and played two first-class games against Northamptonshire. As a result, he became the only Nobel literature laureate to have played first-class cricket. According to Michael Dirda, Beckett is "the only Nobel laureate in Wisden's, the bible of cricket history."

Early writings

Beckett studied French, Italian, and English at Trinity College Dublin from 1923 to 1927 (one of his tutors was the Berkeley scholar A. A. Luce, who introduced him to the work of Henri Bergson). He was elected a Scholar in Modern Languages in 1926. Beckett graduated with a BA and, after teaching briefly at Campbell College in Belfast, took up the post of lecteur d'anglais at the École Normale Supérieure in Paris from November 1928 to 1930. While there, he was introduced to renowned Irish author James Joyce by Thomas MacGreevy, a poet and close confidant of Beckett who also worked there. This meeting had a profound effect on the young man. Beckett assisted Joyce in various ways, one of which was research towards the book that became Finnegans Wake.

In 1929, Beckett published his first work, a critical essay titled "Dante... Bruno. Vico.. Joyce". The essay defends Joyce's work and method, chiefly from allegations of wanton obscurity and dimness, and was Beckett's contribution to Our Exagmination Round His Factification for Incamination of Work in Progress (a book of essays on Joyce which also included contributions by Eugene Jolas, Robert McAlmon, and William Carlos Williams). Beckett's close relationship with Joyce and his family cooled, however, when he rejected the advances of Joyce's daughter Lucia. Beckett's first short story, "Assumption", was published in Jolas's periodical transition. The next year he won a small literary prize for his hastily composed poem "Whoroscope", which draws on a biography of René Descartes that Beckett happened to be reading when he was encouraged to submit.

In 1930, Beckett returned to Trinity College as a lecturer. In November 1930, he presented a paper in French to the Modern Languages Society of Trinity on the Toulouse poet Jean du Chas, founder of a movement called le Concentrisme. It was a literary parody, for Beckett had in fact invented the poet and his movement that claimed to be "at odds with all that is clear and distinct in Descartes". Beckett later insisted that he had not intended to fool his audience. When Beckett resigned from Trinity at the end of 1931, his brief academic career was at an end. He commemorated it with the poem "Gnome", which was inspired by his reading of Johann Wolfgang Goethe's Wilhelm Meister's Apprenticeship and eventually published in The Dublin Magazine in 1934:

Beckett travelled throughout Europe. He spent some time in London, where in 1931 he published Proust, his critical study of French author Marcel Proust. Two years later, following his father's death, he began two years' treatment with Tavistock Clinic psychoanalyst Dr. Wilfred Bion. Aspects of it became evident in Beckett's later works, such as Watt and Waiting for Godot. In 1932, he wrote his first novel, Dream of Fair to Middling Women, but after many rejections from publishers decided to abandon it (it was eventually published in 1992). Despite his inability to get it published, however, the novel served as a source for many of Beckett's early poems, as well as for his first full-length book, the 1933 short-story collection More Pricks Than Kicks.

Beckett published essays and reviews, including "Recent Irish Poetry" (in The Bookman, August 1934) and "Humanistic Quietism", a review of his friend Thomas MacGreevy's Poems (in The Dublin Magazine, July–September 1934). They focused on the work of MacGreevy, Brian Coffey, Denis Devlin and Blanaid Salkeld, despite their slender achievements at the time, comparing them favourably with their Celtic Revival contemporaries and invoking Ezra Pound, T. S. Eliot, and the French symbolists as their precursors. In describing these poets as forming "the nucleus of a living poetic in Ireland", Beckett was tracing the outlines of an Irish poetic modernist canon.

In 1935—the year that he successfully published a book of his poetry, Echo's Bones and Other Precipitates—Beckett worked on his novel Murphy. In May, he wrote to MacGreevy that he had been reading about film and wished to go to Moscow to study with Sergei Eisenstein at the Gerasimov Institute of Cinematography. In mid-1936 he wrote to Eisenstein and Vsevolod Pudovkin to offer himself as their apprentice. Nothing came of this, however, as Beckett's letter was lost owing to Eisenstein's quarantine during the smallpox outbreak, as well as his focus on a script re-write of his postponed film production. In 1936, a friend had suggested he look up the works of Arnold Geulincx, which Beckett did and he took many notes. The philosopher's name is mentioned in Murphy and the reading apparently left a strong impression. Murphy was finished in 1936 and Beckett departed for extensive travel around Germany, during which time he filled several notebooks with lists of noteworthy artwork that he had seen and noted his distaste for the Nazi savagery that was overtaking the country. Returning to Ireland briefly in 1937, he oversaw the publication of Murphy (1938), which he translated into French the following year. He fell out with his mother, which contributed to his decision to settle permanently in Paris. Beckett remained in Paris following the outbreak of World War II in 1939, preferring, in his own words, "France at war to Ireland at peace". His was soon a known face in and around Left Bank cafés, where he strengthened his allegiance with Joyce and forged new ones with artists Alberto Giacometti and Marcel Duchamp, with whom he regularly played chess. Sometime around December 1937, Beckett had a brief affair with Peggy Guggenheim, who nicknamed him "Oblomov" (after the character in Ivan Goncharov's novel).

In January 1938 in Paris, Beckett was stabbed in the chest and nearly killed when he refused the solicitations of a notorious pimp (who went by the name of Prudent). Joyce arranged a private room for Beckett at the hospital. The publicity surrounding the stabbing attracted the attention of Suzanne Dechevaux-Dumesnil, who knew Beckett slightly from his first stay in Paris. This time, however, the two would begin a lifelong companionship. At a preliminary hearing, Beckett asked his attacker for the motive behind the stabbing. Prudent replied: "Je ne sais pas, Monsieur. Je m'excuse" ["I do not know, sir. I'm sorry"]. Beckett eventually dropped the charges against his attacker—partially to avoid further formalities, partly because he found Prudent likeable and well-mannered.

World War II and French Resistance
After the Nazi German occupation of France in 1940, Beckett joined the French Resistance, in which he worked as a courier. On several occasions over the next two years he was nearly caught by the Gestapo. In August 1942, his unit was betrayed and he and Suzanne fled south on foot to the safety of the small village of Roussillon, in the Vaucluse département in Provence-Alpes-Côte d'Azur. During the two years that Beckett stayed in Roussillon he indirectly helped the Maquis sabotage the German army in the Vaucluse mountains, though he rarely spoke about his wartime work in later life. He was awarded the Croix de guerre and the Médaille de la Résistance by the French government for his efforts in fighting the German occupation; to the end of his life, however, Beckett would refer to his work with the French Resistance as "boy scout stuff".

While in hiding in Roussillon, Beckett continued work on the novel Watt. He started the novel in 1941 and completed it in 1945, but it was not published until 1953; however, an extract had appeared in the Dublin literary periodical Envoy. After the war, he returned to France in 1946 where he worked as a stores manager at the Irish Red Cross Hospital based in Saint-Lô. Beckett described his experiences in an untransmitted radio script, "The Capital of the Ruins".

Fame: novels and the theatre

In 1945, Beckett returned to Dublin for a brief visit. During his stay, he had a revelation in his mother's room: his entire future direction in literature appeared to him. Beckett had felt that he would remain forever in the shadow of Joyce, certain to never beat him at his own game. His revelation prompted him to change direction and to acknowledge both his own stupidity and his interest in ignorance and impotence:
"I realised that Joyce had gone as far as one could in the direction of knowing more, [being] in control of one's material. He was always adding to it; you only have to look at his proofs to see that. I realised that my own way was in impoverishment, in lack of knowledge and in taking away, in subtracting rather than in adding."

Knowlson argues that "Beckett was rejecting the Joycean principle that knowing more was a way of creatively understanding the world and controlling it ... In future, his work would focus on poverty, failure, exile and loss – as he put it, on man as a 'non-knower' and as a 'non-can-er.'" The revelation "has rightly been regarded as a pivotal moment in his entire career". Beckett fictionalised the experience in his play Krapp's Last Tape (1958). While listening to a tape he made earlier in his life, Krapp hears his younger self say "clear to me at last that the dark I have always struggled to keep under is in reality my most...", at which point Krapp fast-forwards the tape (before the audience can hear the complete revelation). Beckett later explained to Knowlson that the missing words on the tape are "precious ally".

In 1946, Jean-Paul Sartre's magazine  published the first part of Beckett's short story "Suite" (later to be called "", or "The End"), not realising that Beckett had only submitted the first half of the story; Simone de Beauvoir refused to publish the second part. Beckett also began to write his fourth novel, Mercier et Camier, which was not published until 1970. The novel presaged his most famous work, the play Waiting for Godot, which was written not long afterwards. More importantly, the novel was Beckett's first long work that he wrote in French, the language of most of his subsequent works which were strongly supported by Jérôme Lindon, director of his Parisian publishing house , including the poioumenon "trilogy" of novels: Molloy (1951);  (1951), Malone Dies (1958);  (1953), The Unnamable (1960). Despite being a native English speaker, Beckett wrote in French because—as he himself claimed—it was easier for him thus to write "without style".

Beckett is most famous for his play  (Waiting for Godot; 1953). Like most of his works after 1947, the play was first written in French. Beckett worked on the play between October 1948 and January 1949. His partner, Suzanne Dechevaux-Dumesnil, was integral to its success. Dechevaux-Dumesnil became his agent and sent the manuscript to multiple producers until they met Roger Blin, the soon-to-be director of the play.

Blin's knowledge of French theatre and vision alongside Beckett knowing what he wanted the play to represent contributed greatly to its success. In a much-quoted article, the critic Vivian Mercier wrote that Beckett "has achieved a theoretical impossibility—a play in which nothing happens, that yet keeps audiences glued to their seats. What's more, since the second act is a subtly different reprise of the first, he has written a play in which nothing happens, twice." The play was published in 1952 and premièred in 1953 in Paris; an English translation was performed two years later. The play was a critical, popular, and controversial success in Paris. It opened in London in 1955 to mainly negative reviews, but the tide turned with positive reactions from Harold Hobson in The Sunday Times and, later, Kenneth Tynan. After the showing in Miami, the play became extremely popular, with highly successful performances in the US and Germany. The play is a favourite: it is not only performed frequently but has globally inspired playwrights to emulate it. This is the sole play the manuscript of which Beckett never sold, donated or gave away. He refused to allow the play to be translated into film but did allow it to be played on television.

During this time in the 1950s, Beckett became one of several adults who sometimes drove local children to school; one such child was André Roussimoff, who would later become a famous professional wrestler under the name André the Giant. They had a surprising amount of common ground and bonded over their love of cricket, with Roussimoff later recalling that the two rarely talked about anything else. Beckett translated all of his works into English himself, with the exception of Molloy, for which he collaborated with Patrick Bowles. The success of Waiting for Godot opened up a career in theatre for its author. Beckett went on to write successful full-length plays, including  (Endgame) (1957), Krapp's Last Tape (1958, written in English), Happy Days (1961, also written in English), and Play (1963). In 1961, Beckett received the International Publishers' Formentor Prize in recognition of his work, which he shared that year with Jorge Luis Borges.

Later life and death 
 
The 1960s were a time of change for Beckett, both on a personal level and as a writer. In 1961, he married Suzanne in a secret civil ceremony in England (its secrecy due to reasons relating to French inheritance law). The success of his plays led to invitations to attend rehearsals and productions around the world, leading eventually to a new career as a theatre director. In 1957, he had his first commission from the BBC Third Programme for a radio play, All That Fall. He continued writing sporadically for radio and extended his scope to include cinema and television. He began to write in English again, although he also wrote in French until the end of his life.

From the late 1950s until his death, Beckett had a relationship with Barbara Bray, a widow who worked as a script editor for the BBC. Knowlson wrote of them: "She was small and attractive, but, above all, keenly intelligent and well-read. Beckett seems to have been immediately attracted by her and she to him. Their encounter was highly significant for them both, for it represented the beginning of a relationship that was to last, in parallel with that with Suzanne, for the rest of his life." Barbara Bray died in Edinburgh on 25 February 2010.

In 1969 the avant-garde filmmaker Rosa von Praunheim shot an experimental short film portrait about Beckett, which he named after the writer.

In October 1969 while on holiday in Tunis with Suzanne, Beckett heard that he had won the 1969 Nobel Prize in Literature. Anticipating that her intensely private husband would be saddled with fame from that moment on, Suzanne called the award a "catastrophe". While Beckett did not devote much time to interviews, he sometimes met the artists, scholars, and admirers who sought him out in the anonymous lobby of the Hotel PLM Saint-Jacques in Paris – where he gave his appointments and took frequently his lunches – near his Montparnasse home. Although Beckett was an intensely private man, a review of the second volume of his letters by Roy Foster on 15 December 2011 issue of The New Republic reveals Beckett to be not only unexpectedly amiable but frequently prepared to talk about his work and the process behind it.

Suzanne died on 17 July 1989. Confined to a nursing home and suffering from emphysema and possibly Parkinson's disease, Beckett died a few months later, on 22 December. The two were interred together in the cimetière du Montparnasse in Paris and share a simple granite gravestone that follows Beckett's directive that it should be "any colour, so long as it's grey".

Works

Beckett's career as a writer can be roughly divided into three periods: his early works, up until the end of World War II in 1945; his middle period, stretching from 1945 until the early 1960s, during which he wrote what are probably his best-known works; and his late period, from the early 1960s until Beckett's death in 1989, during which his works tended to become shorter and his style more minimalist.

Early works
Beckett's earliest works are generally considered to have been strongly influenced by the work of his friend James Joyce. They are erudite and seem to display the author's learning merely for its own sake, resulting in several obscure passages. The opening phrases of the short-story collection More Pricks than Kicks (1934) affords a representative sample of this style:

It was morning and Belacqua was stuck in the first of the canti in the moon. He was so bogged that he could move neither backward nor forward. Blissful Beatrice was there, Dante also, and she explained the spots on the moon to him. She shewed him in the first place where he was at fault, then she put up her own explanation. She had it from God, therefore he could rely on its being accurate in every particular.

The passage makes reference to Dante's Commedia, which can serve to confuse readers not familiar with that work. It also anticipates aspects of Beckett's later work: the physical inactivity of the character Belacqua; the character's immersion in his own head and thoughts; the somewhat irreverent comedy of the final sentence.

Similar elements are present in Beckett's first published novel, Murphy (1938), which also explores the themes of insanity and chess (both of which would be recurrent elements in Beckett's later works). The novel's opening sentence hints at the somewhat pessimistic undertones and black humour that animate many of Beckett's works: "The sun shone, having no alternative, on the nothing new". Watt, written while Beckett was in hiding in Roussillon during World War II, is similar in terms of themes but less exuberant in its style. It explores human movement as if it were a mathematical permutation, presaging Beckett's later preoccupation—in both his novels and dramatic works—with precise movement.

Beckett's 1930 essay Proust was strongly influenced by Schopenhauer's pessimism and laudatory descriptions of saintly asceticism. At this time Beckett began to write creatively in the French language. In the late 1930s, he wrote a number of short poems in that language and their sparseness—in contrast to the density of his English poems of roughly the same period, collected in Echo's Bones and Other Precipitates (1935)—seems to show that Beckett, albeit through the medium of another language, was in process of simplifying his style, a change also evidenced in Watt.

Middle period

After World War II, Beckett turned definitively to the French language as a vehicle. It was this, together with the "revelation" experienced in his mother's room in Dublin—in which he realised that his art must be subjective and drawn wholly from his own inner world—that would result in the works for which Beckett is best remembered today.

During the 15 years following the war, Beckett produced four major full-length stage plays: En attendant Godot (written 1948–1949; Waiting for Godot), Fin de partie (1955–1957; Endgame), Krapp's Last Tape (1958), and Happy Days (1961). These plays—which are often considered, rightly or wrongly, to have been instrumental in the so-called "Theatre of the Absurd"—deal in a darkly humorous way with themes similar to those of the roughly contemporary existentialist thinkers. The term "Theatre of the Absurd" was coined by Martin Esslin in a book of the same name; Beckett and Godot were centrepieces of the book. Esslin argued these plays were the fulfilment of Albert Camus's concept of "the absurd"; this is one reason Beckett is often falsely labelled as an existentialist (this is based on the assumption that Camus was an existentialist, though he in fact broke off from the existentialist movement and founded his own philosophy). Though many of the themes are similar, Beckett had little affinity for existentialism as a whole.

Broadly speaking, the plays deal with the subject of despair and the will to survive in spite of that despair, in the face of an uncomprehending and incomprehensible world. The words of Nell—one of the two characters in Endgame who are trapped in ashbins, from which they occasionally peek their heads to speak—can best summarise the themes of the plays of Beckett's middle period: "Nothing is funnier than unhappiness, I grant you that. ... Yes, yes, it's the most comical thing in the world. And we laugh, we laugh, with a will, in the beginning. But it's always the same thing. Yes, it's like the funny story we have heard too often, we still find it funny, but we don't laugh any more."

Beckett's outstanding achievements in prose during the period were the three novels Molloy (1951), Malone meurt (1951; Malone Dies) and L'innommable (1953: The Unnamable). In these novels—sometimes referred to as a "trilogy", though this is against the author's own explicit wishes—the prose becomes increasingly bare and stripped down. Molloy, for instance, still retains many of the characteristics of a conventional novel (time, place, movement, and plot) and it makes use of the structure of a detective novel. In Malone Dies, movement and plot are largely dispensed with, though there is still some indication of place and the passage of time; the "action" of the book takes the form of an interior monologue. Finally, in The Unnamable, almost all sense of place and time are abolished, and the essential theme seems to be the conflict between the voice's drive to continue speaking so as to continue existing, and its almost equally strong urge towards silence and oblivion. Despite the widely held view that Beckett's work, as exemplified by the novels of this period, is essentially pessimistic, the will to live seems to win out in the end; witness, for instance, the famous final phrase of The Unnamable: 'I can't go on, I'll go on'.

After these three novels, Beckett struggled for many years to produce a sustained work of prose, a struggle evidenced by the brief "stories" later collected as Texts for Nothing. In the late 1950s, however, he created one of his most radical prose works, Comment c'est (1961; How It Is). An early variant version of Comment c'est, L'Image, was published in the British arts review, X: A Quarterly Review (1959), and is the first appearance of the novel in any form. This work relates the adventures of an unnamed narrator crawling through the mud while dragging a sack of canned food. It was written as a sequence of unpunctuated paragraphs in a style approaching telegraphese: "You are there somewhere alive somewhere vast stretch of time then it's over you are there no more alive no more than again you are there again alive again it wasn't over an error you begin again all over more or less in the same place or in another as when another image above in the light you come to in hospital in the dark" Following this work, it was almost another decade before Beckett produced a work of non-dramatic prose. How It Is is generally considered to mark the end of his middle period as a writer.

Late works

Throughout the 1960s and into the 1970s, Beckett's works exhibited an increasing tendency—already evident in much of his work of the 1950s—towards compactness. This has led to his work sometimes being described as minimalist. The extreme example of this, among his dramatic works, is the 1969 piece Breath, which lasts for only 35 seconds and has no characters (though it was likely intended to offer ironic comment on Oh! Calcutta!, the theatrical revue for which it served as an introductory piece).

In his theatre of the late period, Beckett's characters—already few in number in the earlier plays—are whittled down to essential elements. The ironically titled Play (1962), for instance, consists of three characters immersed up to their necks in large funeral urns. The television drama Eh Joe (1963), which was written for the actor Jack MacGowran, is animated by a camera that steadily closes in to a tight focus upon the face of the title character. The play Not I (1972) consists almost solely of, in Beckett's words, "a moving mouth with the rest of the stage in darkness". Following from Krapp's Last Tape, many of these later plays explore memory, often in the form of a forced recollection of haunting past events in a moment of stillness in the present. They also deal with the theme of the self-confined and observed, with a voice that either comes from outside into the protagonist's head (as in Eh Joe) or else another character comments on the protagonist silently, by means of gesture (as in Not I). Beckett's most politically charged play, Catastrophe (1982), which was dedicated to Václav Havel, deals relatively explicitly with the idea of dictatorship. After a long period of inactivity, Beckett's poetry experienced a revival during this period in the ultra-terse French poems of mirlitonnades, with some as short as six words long. These defied Beckett's usual scrupulous concern to translate his work from its original into the other of his two languages; several writers, including Derek Mahon, have attempted translations, but no complete version of the sequence has been published in English.

Beckett's prose pieces during the late period were not so prolific as his theatre, as suggested by the title of the 1976 collection of short prose texts Fizzles (which the American artist Jasper Johns illustrated). Beckett experienced something of a renaissance with the novella Company (1980), which continued with Ill Seen Ill Said (1982) and Worstward Ho (1983), later collected in Nohow On. In these three "'closed space' stories," Beckett continued his pre-occupation with memory and its effect on the confined and observed self, as well as with the positioning of bodies in space, as the opening phrases of Company make clear: "A voice comes to one in the dark. Imagine." "To one on his back in the dark. This he can tell by the pressure on his hind parts and by how the dark changes when he shuts his eyes and again when he opens them again. Only a small part of what is said can be verified. As for example when he hears, You are on your back in the dark. Then he must acknowledge the truth of what is said." Themes of aloneness and the doomed desire to successfully connect with other human beings are expressed in several late pieces, including Company and Rockaby.

In the hospital and nursing home where he spent his final days, Beckett wrote his last work, the 1988 poem "What is the Word" ("Comment dire"). The poem grapples with an inability to find words to express oneself, a theme echoing Beckett's earlier work, though possibly amplified by the sickness he experienced late in life.

Collaborators

Jack MacGowran
Jack MacGowran was the first actor to do a one-man show based on the works of Beckett. He debuted End of Day in Dublin in 1962, revising it as Beginning To End (1965). The show went through further revisions before Beckett directed it in Paris in 1970; MacGowran won the 1970–1971 Obie for Best Performance By an Actor when he performed the show off-Broadway as Jack MacGowran in the Works of Samuel Beckett. Beckett wrote the radio play Embers and the teleplay Eh Joe specifically for MacGowran. The actor also appeared in various productions of Waiting for Godot and Endgame, and did several readings of Beckett's plays and poems on BBC Radio; he also recorded the LP, MacGowran Speaking Beckett for Claddagh Records in 1966.

Billie Whitelaw
Billie Whitelaw worked with Beckett for 25 years on such plays as Not I, Eh Joe, Footfalls and Rockaby. She first met Beckett in 1963. In her autobiography Billie Whitelaw... Who He?, she describes their first meeting in 1963 as "trust at first sight". Beckett went on to write many of his experimental theatre works for her. She came to be regarded as his muse, the "supreme interpreter of his work", perhaps most famous for her role as the mouth in Not I. She said of the play Rockaby: "I put the tape in my head. And I sort of look in a particular way, but not at the audience. Sometimes as a director Beckett comes out with absolute gems and I use them a lot in other areas. We were doing Happy Days and I just did not know where in the theatre to look during this particular section. And I asked, and he thought for a bit and then said, 'Inward' ". She said of her role in Footfalls: "I felt like a moving, musical Edvard Munch painting and, in fact, when Beckett was directing Footfalls he was not only using me to play the notes but I almost felt that he did have the paintbrush out and was painting." "Sam knew that I would turn myself inside out to give him what he wanted", she explained. "With all of Sam's work, the scream was there, my task was to try to get it out." She stopped performing his plays in 1989 when he died.

Jocelyn Herbert
The English stage designer Jocelyn Herbert was a close friend and influence on Beckett until his death. She worked with him on such plays as Happy Days (their third project) and Krapp's Last Tape at the Royal Court Theatre. Beckett said that Herbert became his closest friend in England: "She has a great feeling for the work and is very sensitive and doesn't want to bang the nail on the head. Generally speaking, there is a tendency on the part of designers to overstate, and this has never been the case with Jocelyn."

Walter Asmus
The German director Walter D. Asmus began his working relationship with Beckett in the Schiller Theatre in Berlin in 1974 and continued until 1989, the year of the playwright's death. Asmus has directed all of Beckett's plays internationally.

Legacy

Of all the English-language modernists, Beckett's work represents the most sustained attack on the realist tradition. He opened up the possibility of theatre and fiction that dispense with conventional plot and the unities of time and place to focus on essential components of the human condition. Václav Havel, John Banville, Aidan Higgins, Tom Stoppard, Harold Pinter and Jon Fosse have publicly stated their indebtedness to Beckett's example. He has had a wider influence on experimental writing since the 1950s, from the Beat generation to the happenings of the 1960s and after. In an Irish context, he has exerted great influence on poets such as Derek Mahon and Thomas Kinsella, as well as writers like Trevor Joyce and Catherine Walsh who proclaim their adherence to the modernist tradition as an alternative to the dominant realist mainstream.

Many major 20th-century composers including Luciano Berio, György Kurtág, Morton Feldman, Pascal Dusapin, Philip Glass, Roman Haubenstock-Ramati and Heinz Holliger have created musical works based on Beckett's texts. His work has also influenced numerous international writers, artists and filmmakers including Edward Albee, Avigdor Arikha, Paul Auster, J. M. Coetzee, Richard Kalich, Douglas Gordon, Bruce Nauman, Anthony Minghella, Damian Pettigrew, Charlie Kaufman and Brian Patrick Butler.

Beckett is one of the most widely discussed and highly prized of 20th-century authors, inspiring a critical industry to rival that which has sprung up around James Joyce. He has divided critical opinion. Some early philosophical critics, such as Sartre and Theodor Adorno, praised him, one for his revelation of absurdity, the other for his works' critical refusal of simplicities; others such as Georg Lukács condemned him for 'decadent' lack of realism.

Since Beckett's death, all rights for performance of his plays are handled by the Beckett estate, currently managed by Edward Beckett (the author's nephew). The estate has a controversial reputation for maintaining firm control over how Beckett's plays are performed and does not grant licences to productions that do not adhere to the writer's stage directions.

Historians interested in tracing Beckett's blood line were, in 2004, granted access to confirmed trace samples of his DNA to conduct molecular genealogical studies to facilitate precise lineage determination.

Some of the best-known pictures of Beckett were taken by photographer John Minihan, who photographed him between 1980 and 1985 and developed such a good relationship with the writer that he became, in effect, his official photographer. Some consider one of these to be among the top three photographs of the 20th century. It was the theatre photographer John Haynes, however, who took possibly the most widely reproduced image of Beckett: it is used on the cover of the Knowlson biography, for instance. This portrait was taken during rehearsals of the San Quentin Drama Workshop at the Royal Court Theatre in London, where Haynes photographed many productions of Beckett's work.
An Post, the Irish postal service, issued a commemorative stamp of Beckett in 1994.
The Central Bank of Ireland launched two Samuel Beckett Centenary commemorative coins on 26 April 2006: €10 Silver Coin and €20 Gold Coin.

On 10 December 2009, the new bridge across the River Liffey in Dublin was opened and named the Samuel Beckett Bridge in his honour. Reminiscent of a harp on its side, it was designed by the celebrated Spanish architect Santiago Calatrava, who had also designed the James Joyce Bridge situated further upstream and opened on Bloomsday (16 June) 2003. Attendees at the official opening ceremony included Beckett's niece Caroline Murphy, his nephew Edward Beckett, poet Seamus Heaney and Barry McGovern.
A ship of the Irish Naval Service, the LÉ Samuel Beckett (P61), is named for Beckett. An Ulster History Circle blue plaque in his memory is located at Portora Royal School, Enniskillen, County Fermanagh.

In La Ferté-sous-Jouarre, the town where Beckett had a cottage, the public library and one of the local high schools bear his name.

Happy Days Enniskillen International Beckett Festival is an annual multi-arts festival celebrating the work and influence of Beckett. The festival, founded in 2011, is held at Enniskillen, Northern Ireland where Beckett spent his formative years studying at Portora Royal School.

In 1983, the Samuel Beckett Award was established for writers who, in the opinion of a committee of critics, producers and publishers, showed innovation and excellence in writing for the performing arts. In 2003, The Oxford Samuel Beckett Theatre Trust was formed to support the showcasing of new innovative theatre at the Barbican Centre in the City of London.

Music for three Samuel Beckett plays (Words and Music, Cascando, and ...but the clouds...), was composed by Martin Pearlman which was commissioned by the 92nd Street Y in New York for the Beckett centennial and produced there and at Harvard University.

In January 2019 Beckett was the subject of the BBC Radio 4 programme In Our Time. In 2022 James Marsh filmed a biopic of Beckett entitled Dance First, with Gabriel Byrne and Fionn O'Shea playing Beckett at different stages of his life. The film is expected to be available through Sky Cinema in 2023.

Archives 
Samuel Beckett's prolific career is spread across archives around the world. Significant collections include those at the Harry Ransom Center, Washington University in St. Louis, the University of Reading, Trinity College Dublin, and Houghton Library. Given the scattered nature of these collections, an effort has been made to create a digital repository through the University of Antwerp.

Honours and awards
Croix de guerre (France)
 Médaille de la Résistance (France)
1959 honorary doctorate from Trinity College Dublin
1961 International Publishers' Formentor Prize (shared with Jorge Luis Borges)
1968 Foreign Honorary Member of the American Academy of Arts and Sciences
1969 Nobel Prize in Literature
Saoi of Aosdana (Ireland)
2016 The house that Beckett lived at in 1934 (48 Paultons Square, Chelsea, London) received an English Heritage Blue Plaque
Obies (for Off-Broadway plays):
1958 Endgame
1960 Krapp's Last Tape
1962 Happy Days
1964 Play

Selected works by Beckett

Dramatic works

Theatre
 Human Wishes (c. 1936; published 1984)
 Eleutheria (written 1947 in French; published in French 1995, and English 1996)
 En attendant Godot (published 1952, performed 1953) (Waiting for Godot, pub. 1954, perf. 1955)
 Acte sans Paroles I (1956); Act Without Words I (1957)
 Acte sans Paroles II (1956); Act Without Words II (1957) 
 Fin de partie (published 1957); Endgame (published 1957)
 Krapp's Last Tape (first performed 1958)
 Fragment de théâtre I (late 1950s); Rough for Theatre I
 Fragment de théâtre II (late 1950s); Rough for Theatre II 
 Happy Days (first performed 1961); Oh les beaux jours (published 1963)
 Play (performed in German, as Spiel, 1963; English version 1964)
 Come and Go (first performed in German, then English, 1966)
 Breath (first performed 1969)
 Not I (first performed 1972)
 That Time (first performed 1976)
 Footfalls (first performed 1976)
 Neither (1977) (An "opera", music by Morton Feldman)
 A Piece of Monologue (first performed 1979)
 Rockaby (first performed 1981)
 Ohio Impromptu (first performed 1981)
 Catastrophe (Catastrophe et autres dramatiques, first performed 1982)
 What Where (first performed 1983)

Radio
 All That Fall (broadcast 1957)
 From an Abandoned Work (broadcast 1957)
 Embers (broadcast 1959)
 Rough for Radio I (published 1976) (written in French in 1961 as Esquisse radiophonique)
 Rough for Radio II (published 1976) (written in French in 1961 as Pochade radiophonique)
 Words and Music (broadcast 1962)
 Cascando (broadcast:1963 French version; 1964 English translation)

Television
 Eh Joe with Jack MacGowran (broadcast 1966)
 Beginning To End with Jack MacGowran (1965)
 Ghost Trio (broadcast 1977)
 ... but the clouds ... (broadcast 1977)
 Quad I + II (broadcast 1981)
 Nacht und Träume (broadcast 1983); Night and Dreams, published 1984
 Beckett Directs Beckett (1988–92)

Cinema
 Film (1965)

Prose

The Trilogy
 Molloy (1951); English version (1955) 
 Malone meurt (1951); Malone Dies (1956)
 L'innommable (1953); The Unnamable (1958)

Novels
 Dream of Fair to Middling Women (written 1932; published 1992)
 Murphy (1938); 1947 Beckett's French version
 Watt (1953); 1968, Beckett's French version
 Comment c'est (1961); How It Is (1964)
 Mercier and Camier (written 1946, published 1970); English translation (1974)
Short prose
 More Pricks Than Kicks (1934)
 "Echo's Bones" (written 1933, published 2014)
 "L'Expulsé", written 1946, in Nouvelles et Textes pour rien (1955); "The Expelled" Stories and Texts for Nothing (1967)
 "Le Calmant", written 1946, in Nouvelles et Textes pour rien (1955); "The Calmative", Stories and Texts for Nothing (1967)
 "La Fin", written 1946, partially published in Les Temps Modernes in 1946 as "Suite"; in Nouvelles et Textes pour rien (1955); "The End", Stories and Texts for Nothing (1967)
 "Texts for Nothing", translated into French for Nouvelles et Textes pour rien (1955); Stories and Texts for Nothing (1967)
 "L'Image" (1959) a fragment from Comment c'est
 '"Premier Amour" (1970, written 1946); translated by Beckett as "First Love", 1973
 Le Dépeupleur (1970); The Lost Ones (1971)
 Pour finir encore et autres foirades (1976); For to End Yet Again and Other Fizzles (1976)
 Company (1980)
 Mal vu mal dit (1981); Ill Seen Ill Said (1982)
 Worstward Ho (1983)
 "Stirrings Still" (1988)
 "As the Story was Told" (1990)
 The Complete Short Prose: 1929–1989, ed S. E. Gontarski. New York: Grove Press, 1995

Non-fiction
 "Dante...Bruno. Vico..Joyce" (1929; Beckett's contribution to the collection Our Exagmination Round His Factification for Incamination of Work in Progress)
 Proust (1931)
 Three Dialogues (with Georges Duthuit and Jacques Putnam) (1949)
 Disjecta: Miscellaneous Writings and a Dramatic Fragment (1929–1967)

Poetry collections
 Whoroscope (1930)
 Echo's Bones and other Precipitates (1935)
 Poèmes (1968, expanded 1976, 1979, 1992) migrationid:060807crbo_books| Search : The New Yorker
 Poems in English (1961)
 Collected Poems in English and French (1977)
 What is the Word (1989)
 Selected Poems 1930–1989 (2009)
 The Collected Poems of Samuel Beckett, edited, annotated by Seán Lawlor, John Pilling (2012, Faber and Faber, 2014, Grove Press)

Translation collections and long works
 Anna Livia Plurabelle (James Joyce, French translation by Beckett and others) (1931)
 Negro: an Anthology (Nancy Cunard, editor) (1934)
 Anthology of Mexican Poems (Octavio Paz, editor) (1958)
 The Old Tune (Robert Pinget) (1963)
 What Is Surrealism? Selected Essays (André Breton) (various short pieces in the collection)

Reviews
 Herdman, John (1975), review of Mercier and Camier, in Calgacus 1, Winter 1975, p. 58,

See also
Beckett–Gray code

References

Further reading
 Kenner, Hugh (1961). Samuel Beckett: A Critical Study. New York City: Grove Press. 
 Simpson, Alan (1962). Beckett and Behan and a Theatre in Dublin. Routledge and Kegan Paul.
 
 Esslin, Martin (1969). The Theatre of the Absurd. Garden City, NY: Anchor Books.
 Ryan, John, ed. (1970). A Bash in the Tunnel. Brighton: Clifton Books. 1970. Essays on James Joyce by Beckett, Flann O'Brien, & Patrick Kavanagh.
 Mercier, Vivian (1977). Beckett/Beckett. Oxford University Press. .
 Bair, Deirdre (1978). Samuel Beckett: A Biography. Vintage/Ebury. .
 O'Brien, Eoin (1986). The Beckett Country. .
 Young, Jordan R. (1987). The Beckett Actor: Jack MacGowran, Beginning to End. Beverly Hills: Moonstone Press. .
 Manuel Vázquez Montalbán and Willi Glasauer (1988). Scenes from World Literature and Portraits of Greatest Authors. Barcelona: Círculo de Lectores.
 Kennedy, Andrew K. (1989). Samuel Beckett. Cambridge: Cambridge University Press.
 Gussow, Mel. "Samuel Beckett Is Dead at 83; His 'Godot' Changed Theater". The New York Times, 27 December 1989.
 Ricks, Christopher (1995). Beckett's Dying Words. Oxford University Press. .
 
 Cronin, Anthony (1997). Samuel Beckett: The Last Modernist. New York City: Da Capo Press.
 Kelleter, Frank (1998). Die Moderne und der Tod: Edgar Allan Poe – T. S. Eliot – Samuel Beckett. Frankfurt/Main: Peter Lang.
 Kamyabi Mask, Ahmad (1999). Les temps de l'attente. Paris: A. Kamyabi Mask. .
 Igoe, Vivien (2000). A Literary Guide to Dublin. Methuen Publishing. .
 Badiou, Alain (2003). On Beckett, transl. and ed. by Alberto Toscano and Nina Power. London: Clinamen Press.
 Hall, Peter. "Godotmania". The Guardian. 4 January 2003. Retrieved 24 August 2010.
 Ridgway, Keith. Keith Ridgway considers Beckett's Mercier and Camier. "Knowing me, knowing you". The Guardian. 19 July 2003. Retrieved 24 August 2010.
 Ackerley, C. J. and S. E. Gontarski, ed. (2004). The Grove Companion to Samuel Beckett. New York City: Grove Press.
 Fletcher, John (2006). About Beckett. Faber and Faber, London. .
 Kunkel, Benjamin. . The New Yorker. 7 August 2006. Retrieved 24 August 2010.
 Caselli, Daniela (2006). Beckett's Dantes: Intertextuality in the Fiction and Criticism. .
 Casanova, Pascale (2007). Beckett: Anatomy of a Literary Revolution. Introduction by Terry Eagleton. London / New York City : Verso Books.
 Mével, Yann. L'imaginaire mélancolique de Samuel Beckett de Murphy à Comment c'est. Rodopi. coll. " Faux titre ". 2008..
 Murray, Christopher, ed. (2009). Samuel Beckett: Playwright & Poet. New York City: Pegasus Books. .
 Coetzee, J. M. "The Making of Samuel Beckett". The New York Review of Books. 30 April 2009. Retrieved 24 August 2010.
 Gontarski, S. E., ed. (2010). A Companion to Samuel Beckett. Oxford: Blackwell.
 Harvey, Robert (2010). "Witnessness: Beckett, Levi, Dante and the Foundations of Ethics". Continuum. .
 Binchy, Maeve. "When Beckett met Binchy". The Irish Times. Retrieved 22 August 2012.
 Bryce, Eleanor. "Dystopia in the plays of Samuel Beckett: Purgatory in Play".
 Turiel, Max. "Samuel Beckett By the Way: Obra en un Acto". Text and playwriting on Beckett. Ed. Liber Factory. 2014. .
 Gannon, Charles: John S. Beckett - The Man and the Music. Dublin: 2016, Lilliput Press. .
 Wheatley, David (Jan. 2017). "Black diamonds of pessimism". The Times Literary Supplement. Book review of: George Craig, Martha Dow Fehsenfeld, Dan Gunn and Lois More Overbeck, editors, The Letters of Samuel Beckett, Volume Four: 1966–1989, Cambridge University Press.
 Davies, William (2020). Samuel Beckett and the Second World War. London: Bloomsbury.

External links

Archival collections 
 Samuel Beckett Collection at the Harry Ransom Center
 Carlton Lake Collection of Samuel Beckett and the Deirdre Bair Collection of Samuel Beckett at the Harry Ransom Center
 
 Samuel Beckett Collection at the University of Reading
 Samuel Beckett Collection at Stuart A. Rose Manuscript, Archives, and Rare Book Library
 Samuel Beckett Collection at Dartmouth College Library
 Finding aid to Sighle Kennedy papers on Samuel Beckett at Columbia University. Rare Book & Manuscript Library.
 Finding aid to Samuel Beckett letters to Warren Brown at Columbia University. Rare Book & Manuscript Library.

Other links 
 The Samuel Beckett Society. Retrieved 2010-08-24
 The Beckett International Foundation, University of Reading.. Retrieved 2010-08-24
 Samuel Beckett Digital Manuscript Project
 The Journal of Beckett Studies. Edinburgh University Press.. Retrieved 2010-08-24
 University of Texas online exhibition of Beckett at the Harry Ransom Center. Retrieved 2010-08-24
 Nick Mount on Samuel Beckett's Waiting For Godot. Video lecture. University of Toronto.. Retrieved 2010-08-24
 Dystopia in the plays of Samuel Beckett: Purgatory in Play (Eleanor Bryce). Retrieved 2012-10-02
 The Beckett Country Collection. A UCD Digital Library Collection 
 Nobel profile
 
 
 BBC Radio 4 programme on Samuel Beckett with James Knowlson: listen online
 The Beckett family in the 1911 Census of Ireland
 Samuel Beckett
 Samuel Beckett | Irish author
 
 "Sentences / All alKinds of Obscure Tensions" by Brian Dillon found in Issue 67 of Cabinet Magazine (2019–20).

 
1906 births
1989 deaths
20th-century essayists
20th-century Irish dramatists and playwrights
20th-century Irish novelists
20th-century Irish male writers
20th-century Irish poets
20th-century Irish short story writers
20th-century Irish translators
Academics of Trinity College Dublin
Alumni of Trinity College Dublin
Analysands of Wilfred Bion
Anti-natalists
Burials at Montparnasse Cemetery
Respiratory disease deaths in France
Deaths from emphysema
Dublin University cricketers
Academic staff of the École Normale Supérieure
Existentialists
Fellows of the American Academy of Arts and Sciences
Former Anglicans
French Resistance members
Irish agnostics
Irish artists
Irish cricketers
Irish essayists
Irish expatriates in France
Irish former Christians
Irish male dramatists and playwrights
Irish male non-fiction writers
Irish male novelists
Irish male short story writers
Irish modernist poets
Irish Nobel laureates
Irish people of French descent
Irish people of World War II
Irish theatre directors
Irish translators
Irish writers in French
Modernist writers
Absurdist writers
Nobel laureates in Literature
People educated at Portora Royal School
People from Foxrock
Philosophical pessimists
Prix Italia winners
Recipients of the Croix de Guerre 1939–1945 (France)
Recipients of the Resistance Medal
Saoithe
Scholars of Trinity College Dublin
Stabbing survivors
Writers from Dublin (city)
People with Parkinson's disease